Astylopsis perplexa is a species of longhorn beetles of the subfamily Lamiinae. It was described by Haldeman in 1847.

References

Beetles described in 1847
Acanthocinini